Annemieke Kiesel (née Griffioen; born 30 November 1979) is a former Dutch footballer and coach. She played for clubs in the Netherlands, United States, England and Germany, winning titles with Dutch and German clubs. She also played for the Dutch national team between 1995 and 2011, retiring with 156 caps, making her the player with the second most appearances for the Dutch national team (men and women) of all time. Following her playing career, she took on coaching and has worked either as assistant coach or as head coach.

Club career
Born in Kockengen, she started playing football at the age of 7 for amateur club OSV Nita in Nieuwer Ter Aa, as the club did not have a girls team, she played in the boys youth teams. At the age of 11 she changed club and played in the girls team of CS Wilnis and after a couple of years she was in the club's first women's team. In 1994 she arrived at Hoofdklasse (first division) club SV Saestum, where she played for 10 years, winning the Dutch League six times and the Dutch Cup on three occasions, it was also during her time at the club that she first played in the UEFA Women's Cup, making her debut on 25 September 2002 in the 2002–03 UEFA Women's Cup match against SK Trondheims-Ørn.

In the summer of 2004, she left the Netherlands and went to the United States, where she played 8 matches for Charlotte Lady Eagles in the 2004 USL W-League season.

Later that year (2004) she returned to Europe, joined English FA Women's Premier League club Bristol Academy and  played a total of 20 matches (16 league and 4 cup) scoring 5 goals (3 league and 2 cup) during her single season at the club.

In 2005, she joined German Bundesliga club FCR 2001 Duisburg. She did not manage to win the league at the club, was runner-up on four occasions, but won the German Cup twice (2008–09 and 2009–10) and won the UEFA Women's Cup in 2008–09. After the 2010–11 season she announced her retirement from football, having played over 120 official matches in all competitions (104 league matches) for CR 2001 Duisburg.

International career
Her debut for the Netherlands women's national football team came when she was 16 years old, on 9 December 1995 against France in a 1997 UEFA Women's Euro qualification match. Over the years she was regularly picked in the starting line-up team and featured in many matches, but the team only played minor tournaments (she won a silver medal in the 2001 Universiade) as it did not manage to qualify for major tournaments.

At UEFA Women's Euro 2009, the first major tournament the women's team played, Kiesel-Griffioen played a very good tournament and had an important role in the Dutch midfield. The team beat Ukraine and Denmark (lost to Finland) in the group stage, to then eliminate France (on penalty shoot-out) in the quarter-final and were 3 minutes away from another penalty shoot-out in the semi-final but fell to England's winning goal. The semifinal match was Kiesel-Griffioen 141st match for the Dutch team (equalling Marleen Wissink record).

On 24 October 2009, she broke the record against Norway earning her 142nd cap.

Her last match for the national team, on 18 May 2011 against North Korea, was her 156th cap making her the player with the most appearances for the Dutch national team (men and women) of all time.

International goals
Scores and results list the Netherlands goal tally first.

Coaching career
Since retiring as a player, she took on coaching women's teams and was first appointed as an assistant coach at Dutch club VVV-Venlo in 2011. She returned to Duisburg to work between 2012 and 2014 as assistant coach and head coach at the youth teams of FCR 2001 Duisburg and subsequently MSV Duisburg (which absorbed FRC 2001 Duisburg in 2014). She gave up on coaching and has worked as a scout for the Royal Dutch Football Association (KNVB), she watched opponents and informed the KNVB staff about them in the 2013 UEFA Women's Euro and 2015 FIFA Women's World Cup.

Honours

Clubs
SV Saestum
Hoofdklasse: Winner (6) 1995–96, 1996–97, 1997–98, 1998–99, 1999–2000, 2001–02
Dutch Cup: Winner (3) 1997–98, 1998–99, 2003–04

FCR 2001 Duisburg
Bundesliga: Runner-up (4) 2005–06, 2006–07, 2007–08, 2009–10
German Cup: Winner (2) 2008–09, 2009–10, Runner-up (1) 2006–07
UEFA Women's Cup: Winner (1) 2008–09

Individual
Best player Hoofdklasse: 2002–03

References

External links
 
 Player German domestic football stats  at DFB
 

1979 births
Living people
People from Breukelen
Dutch women's footballers
Netherlands women's international footballers
Women's association football midfielders
Expatriate women's soccer players in the United States
Expatriate women's footballers in England
Expatriate women's footballers in Germany
Dutch expatriate sportspeople in the United States
Footballers from Utrecht (province)
USL W-League (1995–2015) players
FA Women's National League players
Frauen-Bundesliga players
Bristol Academy W.F.C. players
FCR 2001 Duisburg players
FIFA Century Club
Dutch expatriate women's footballers
Dutch expatriate sportspeople in Germany
Dutch expatriate sportspeople in England
SV Saestum players
Charlotte Lady Eagles players